The 2013–14 Sheffield Shield season was the 112th season of the Sheffield Shield, the domestic first-class cricket competition of Australia. It was held after the conclusion of the Ryobi One-Day Cup and included a break halfway through for the entirety of the Big Bash League. As a part of Cricket Australia's campaign for day/night Tests, it included three day/night matches, played with the pink ball. The separation of the tournaments meant that players in the national Test squad only played two or three Shield matches before the first Test of the 2013–14 Ashes series.

Points table

Group stage

Round 1

Round 2

Round 3

Round 4

Round 5

Round 6

Round 7

Round 8

Round 9

Round 10

Final

References

External links
 Sheffield Shield 2013/14 on ESPN Cricinfo
 Bupa Sheffield Shield on Cricket Australia

Sheffield Shield
Sheffield Shield
Sheffield Shield seasons